Winter Universiade 2017, the XXVIII Winter Universiade, was a multi-sport winter event which took place in Almaty, Kazakhstan from 29 January to 8 February 2017. On 29 November 2011, FISU announced that Winter Universiade 2017 would be hosted in Almaty.

Student-athletes from all over the world between the ages of 17 and 28 arrived in Almaty to take part in Winter Universiade organized by FISU.

Host selection
There were two candidates to host the event.

 Almaty. This is the third time that a former soviet country has hosted the Winter Universiade. Russia hosted two times the Summer Universiade – Moscow (1973), Kazan (2013) and hosted the Winter Universiade two years later in Krasnoyarsk.
 Trentino, Italy. Until 2011, Italy hosted the Universiade 9 times (4 Summer Universiades and 5 Winter Universiades).  A week before the announcement of results of the bidding campaign, in connection with the economic crisis, the Italian government decided to withdraw its candidacy.As

«Given the difficult economic situation in Italy and the high financial obligations to the International Federation for the moment, the Council of the Autonomous Province of Trento sees no possibility to raise funds for the 2017 Winter Universiade in and therefore removed the candidature of the province.»

Later Trentino was invited to host the 2013 Winter Universiade, after Maribor withdrew to host the event,as the province didn't even need to build a specific competition venue for the event and the candidacy had an excellent technical level.

Formal decision on the Winter Universiade at the city was taken on a vote of the International University Sports Federation (FISU) on November 29, 2011, which was held in Brussels (Belgium).

Thus, due to the lack of competitors, Almaty was acclaimed the host city of the 28th Winter Universiade in 2017.

Sports
As the FISU regulations determine, the Organizing Committee of each edition can choose up to 3 optional sports for each edition and the Almaty 2017 Organizing Committee chose: Nordic combined, ski jumping and speed skating.

Numbers in parentheses indicate the number of medal events contested in each sport.

Venues

Almaty
Earlier it was reported that Kazakhstan would spend $950 million on Winter Universiade 2017. An Ice Palace, two ice rinks, an Athletic Village and international airport terminal and many more other sport and non-sport venues were to be built in Almaty for the event. The cost is considered small, and it is because some of the objects had already been built for the 7th Asian Winter Games, part of the competition which also took place in Almaty, and certain existing and remodeled venues. Kazakhstan chose bandy, ski jumping, Nordic combined, freestyle skiing and speed skating as optional sports, with bandy being in the form of demonstration. However, after tightening the budget, bandy was removed.

Almaty Region

Schedule
The competition schedule for the 2017 Winter Universiade is shown as follows: The opening ceremony of the 28th Winter Universiade was held on 29 January 2017.  A total of 1,604 athletes from 56 countries arrived in Almaty to compete in 85 events and 12 types of sports.

Withdrawn events 
Bandy was supposed to debut as a demonstration sport. However, after tightening of the budget, Bandy was no longer part of the programme.

On January 17, it was announced the cancellation of pairs competition in the figure skating due to the low number of entrants. Only two pairs from Russia were registered in the event, which forced the cancellation of the same, according to the rules of FISU.

Participating nations
56 national university sports federations sent a total of 1,604 athletes.
The International University Sports Federation (FISU) declared there were no positive doping cases at the 28th Winter Universiade.

 
 
 
 
 
 
 
 
 
 
 
 
 
 
 
 
 
 
 
 
 
 
 
 
 
 
 
  (host)
 
 
 
 
 
 
 
 
 
 
 
 
 
 
 
 
 
 
 
 
 
   Chinese Taipei (3)

Medal table

Logo of the Winter Universiade 2017 

The logo of the Winter Universiade 2017 was created considering the following images:
 Letter "U" – is an essential attribute of all Universiade logos
 Wings – symbolizes the aspiration to win
The logo was created in bright and soft colors that emphasize the modernity and the eco-friendly approach, which is one of the most important elements of the general concept of the Games.

References

External links

Universiade-2017 in Almaty
Results book

 
2017
2017 in multi-sport events
Sports competitions in Almaty
2017 in Kazakhstani sport
International sports competitions hosted by Kazakhstan
Multi-sport events in Kazakhstan
January 2017 sports events in Asia
February 2017 sports events in Asia
Winter sports competitions in Kazakhstan
2017 in winter sports